Indian Mission Church is a historic Methodist church located in Millsboro, Sussex County, Delaware. It was built in 1921, and is a one-story, wood-frame building covered with clapboard siding and in the Late Gothic Revival style.   It features a two-story hipped roof tower and lancet windows.  The congregation was organized in 1881 from the Harmony Church after the strongly Native American families of the Nanticoke community separated after the hiring of an African American minister.

It was added to the National Register of Historic Places in 1979.

See also
Indian Mission School

References

External links

Indian Mission United Methodist Church website

United Methodist churches in Delaware
Churches on the National Register of Historic Places in Delaware
Carpenter Gothic church buildings in Delaware
Churches completed in 1921
Churches in Sussex County, Delaware
Nanticoke tribe
Native American history of Delaware
National Register of Historic Places in Sussex County, Delaware
Millsboro, Delaware